Hanover Chapel, Brighton was originally a congregationalist chapel built in Brighton, East Sussex in 1825. It was built on land located beside Church Street and North Road for Rev. James Edwards, a local presbyterian minister. However, Edwards left for Bognor Regis, where he opened another chapel, also known as Hanover Chapel, in deference to the House of Hanover, the Royal House at that time.

References

Brighton